Ash is a small civil parish in the South Derbyshire district of Derbyshire, with a population of 98 (2001 census).  The parish includes scattered hamlets and Ashe Hall, the Tara Buddhist Centre.

History
Ash was listed in the Domesday book as Ashe in the hundred of Appletree, belonging to Henry de Ferrers and being worth thirty shillings. The village was still known as Ashe in 1646, then after 1770 was usually written as Ash.

References

Civil parishes in Derbyshire